Nebria bargusinica is a species of ground beetle in the Nebriinae subfamily that is endemic to Buryatia, Russia.

References

bargusinica
Beetles described in 1999
Endemic fauna of Buryatia